Mimas was a nationally designated academic data centre based at the University of Manchester in the United Kingdom. Its mission was to support the advancement of knowledge, research, and teaching. It hosted a number of the UK's research information assets – and built applications to help people access this resource. The organisation had a long-standing relationship with Jisc, and strong connections with research councils, especially the Economic and Social Research Council.

See also
Archives Hub
Copac
ESDS International
IESR
Intute
UK PubMed Central
Landmap

References

External links
 

Education in England
Information technology organisations based in the United Kingdom
Jisc
Non-profit organisations based in the United Kingdom
Research institutes in Manchester
University of Manchester